When Ladies Meet is a 1933 pre-Code film directed by Harry Beaumont and starring Ann Harding, Myrna Loy, Robert Montgomery, Alice Brady, and Frank Morgan. The film is the first adaptation of the 1932 Rachel Crothers play of the same name. It was nominated for an Academy Award for Best Art Direction by Cedric Gibbons.

The film was remade under the same name in 1941, starring Greer Garson, Joan Crawford, Robert Taylor and Herbert Marshall in the lead roles played by Harding, Loy, Montgomery and Morgan.

Plot
Mary (Myrna Loy), a writer working on a novel about a love triangle, is attracted to her publisher (Frank Morgan). Her suitor Jimmie (Robert Montgomery) is determined to break them up. He introduces Mary to the publisher's wife (Ann Harding) without telling Mary who she is.

Background 
Ann Harding had come to Hollywood in 1929, where she signed a well-paid contract with the film company Pathé Exchange, Inc. Within a few months, she had already become one of the top stars of talkies, eventually even being nominated for an Oscar for Best Actress for her performance in Holiday in 1930. However, when Pathé was taken over by the newly founded company RKO Pictures at the end of 1930, her career began to decline rapidly. Constant arguments about suitable screenplays, wrong decisions and increasing internal competition from new stars like Katharine Hepburn and Irene Dunne led to an ongoing crisis. None of their films had made a profit since 1931. In late 1932, Harding signed a three-film contract with MGM hoping to find better scripts and more professional working conditions there.

The adaptation of When Ladies Meet was the first project to be tackled. The film is based on the play of the same name by Rachel Crothers, which had 173 performances on Broadway during the 1932-33 winter season, with Spring Byington playing the role of Bridget Drake, as in the film. MGM remade the story in 1941 as When Ladies Meet, this time starring Joan Crawford, Greer Garson, Robert Taylor and Herbert Marshall. The cast initially saw Kay Francis play Claire and Harding as Mary before Francis was replaced by Myrna Loy and Harding settled on the role of the long-suffering wife. Loy and Harding had worked together on The Animal Kingdom a year earlier. Myrna Loy later characterized her co-star as very well-mannered, but also reserved and reserved. There were never any personal discussions with Harding. This assessment was shared by many of Harding's colleagues.

Cast
 Ann Harding as Claire Woodruff
 Robert Montgomery as Jimmie Lee
 Myrna Loy as Mary Howard
 Alice Brady as Bridget Drake
 Frank Morgan as Rogers Woodruff
 Martin Burton as Walter
 Luis Alberni as Pierre
 David Newell as Freddie (Uncredited)
 Sterling Holloway as Jerome The Caddy (Uncredited)

References

External links
 
 
 
 

1933 films
American black-and-white films
Metro-Goldwyn-Mayer films
Films directed by Harry Beaumont
Films directed by Robert Z. Leonard
1933 romantic comedy films
American films based on plays
American romantic comedy films
1930s English-language films
1930s American films